Round Butte Dam is a rockfill-type hydroelectric dam on the Deschutes River, in the U.S. state of Oregon.

Located in Jefferson County and owned by the power company Portland General Electric, its reservoir is called Lake Billy Chinook.

The dam was completed in 1965 after three years of construction. More than 10 million tons of earth-fill were used to create this 440-foot tall, 1,320-foot wide, and 1,570-foot thick at the base storage dam.

See also

 List of lakes in Oregon

References

Dams in Oregon
Hydroelectric power plants in Oregon
Buildings and structures in Jefferson County, Oregon
Portland General Electric dams
Dams completed in 1964
Energy infrastructure completed in 1964
1964 establishments in Oregon
Rock-filled dams
Dams on the Deschutes River (Oregon)